Fuimaono Karl Pulotu-Endemann  is a Samoan-born, New Zealand-based academic, nurse and fa'afafine and is called by Te Ara: The Encyclopedia of New Zealand "one of New Zealand's best-known and most honoured fa'afafine".

Pulotu-Endemann moved to New Zealand as a child in 1959.

After training initially as a psychiatric nurse, Pulotu-Endemann became a health consultant on the Pacific Health issue, and created the Fonofale Model of Pacific Health has been accepted by the Mental Health Commission of New Zealand.

As an educator, Pulotu-Endemann rose to be associate-head of Manawatu Polytechnic's Nursing and Health Studies (now UCOL).

In 1990, Pulotu-Endemann became one of only two Pacifica Justice of the Peace in New Zealand.

Selected works 
 Pulotu-Endemann, Fuimaono Karl, and Sione Tuʼitahi. Fonofale: Model of health. Fuimaono Karl Pulotu-Endemann, 2009.
 Agnew, Francis, Fuimaono Karl Pulotu-Endemann, Gail Robinson, Tamasailau Suaalii-Sauni, Helen Warren, Amanda Wheeler, Maliaga Erick, Tevita Hingano, and Helen Schmidt-Sopoaga. "Pacific models of mental health service delivery in New Zealand (“PMMHSD”) project." Auckland: Health Research Council of New Zealand (2004).
 Crawley, Louisa, Fuimaono Karl Pulotu-Endemann, and Rosaline Tofilau Utumapu Stanley-Findlay. Strategic directions for the mental health services for Pacific Islands people. Ministry of Health, 1995.
 Pulotu-Endemann, Karl, and Paul Spoonley. "Being Samoan: Samoan ethnicity in New Zealand." New Zealand and International Migration: A digest and bibliography 2 (1992).
 Pulotu-Endemann, F. Karl, and Carmel L. Peteru. "Beyond the Paradise myth: Sexuality and identity." Tangata o te moana nui: The evolving identities of Pacific peoples in Aotearoa/New Zealand (2001): 122-136.

Honours
In the 2001 New Year Honours, Pulotu-Endemann was appointed a Member of the New Zealand Order of Merit, for services to public health. He is also a sitting member of the CreativeNZ Pacific Arts Committee

References

Living people
Place of birth missing (living people)
Year of birth missing (living people)
Samoan emigrants to New Zealand
Mental health professionals
New Zealand justices of the peace
New Zealand nurses
Members of the New Zealand Order of Merit
Academic staff of Universal College of Learning
Fa'afafine